Herman Philip Goebel (April 5, 1853 – May 4, 1930) was an American lawyer and politician who served four terms as a U.S. Representative from Ohio from 1903 to 1911.

Early life and career 
Born in Cincinnati, Ohio, Goebel attended public schools.
He was graduated from the Cincinnati Law School in 1872?
He was admitted to the bar in 1874 and commenced practice in Cincinnati.
He served as member of the State house of representatives in 1875 and 1876.
He served as judge of the probate court of Hamilton County 1884–1890.

Congress 
Goebel was elected as a Republican to the Fifty-eighth and to the three succeeding Congresses (March 4, 1903 – March 4, 1911).
He was an unsuccessful candidate for reelection in 1910 to the Sixty-second Congress.

Later career and death 
He engaged in the practice of his profession until his death in Cincinnati, Ohio, May 4, 1930.
He was interred in Spring Grove Cemetery.

Sources

1853 births
1930 deaths
University of Cincinnati College of Law alumni
Republican Party members of the Ohio House of Representatives
Politicians from Cincinnati
Burials at Spring Grove Cemetery
Republican Party members of the United States House of Representatives from Ohio